Alessandro Fabbro (born 18 February 1981) is an Italian football coach and former player, currently in charge as assistant coach of Pergolettese.

Playing career
Born in Cormons, Fabbro made his senior debuts with Martina Franca, in Serie C1. After playing for Serie C2 clubs, he enjoyed two successive promotions with Juve Stabia.

On 28 August 2018, he joined Serie D club Pergolettese.

On 30 August 2019, he moved to Cjarlins Muzane in Serie D.

Coaching career
In October 2020, Fabbro was appointed youth coach of Avellino.
In July 2022, he left Avellino to accept an offer to become the new assistant coach of Serie C club Pergolettese.

On 31 August 2022, following the resignations of Giovanni Mussa, Fabbro was named new caretaker head coach of Pergolettese. He served on his role until 27 September 2022, when Alberto Villa was appointed as the new permanent head coach.

References

External links

1981 births
Living people
Association football defenders
Italian footballers
Serie B players
Serie C players
Serie D players
A.S.D. Barletta 1922 players
S.S. Juve Stabia players
U.S. Pergolettese 1932 players
U.S. Avellino 1912 players